Compatibility may refer to:

Computing
 Backward compatibility, in which newer devices can understand data generated by older devices
 Compatibility card, an expansion card for hardware emulation of another device
 Compatibility layer, components that allow for non-native support of components
 Compatibility mode, software mechanism in which a software emulates an older version of software
 Computer compatibility, of a line of machines
 IBM PC compatible, computers that are generally similar to the original IBM PC, XT, or AT
 Hardware compatibility, between different pieces of computer hardware
 License compatibility, of software licenses
 Pin compatibility, in devices that have the same functions assigned to the same particular pins
 Software compatibility, between different pieces of software
 Software incompatibility

Science and mathematics
 Compatibility (biological), a property which is assigned to splits of a given set of taxa
 Compatibility (chemical), how stable a substance is when mixed with another substance
 Compatibility (geochemistry), how readily a particular trace element substitutes for a major element within a mineral
 Compatibility (mechanics), the study of compatible deformations in continuum mechanics
 Electromagnetic compatibility, which studies the unintentional generation, propagation, and reception of electromagnetic energy
 Consistency, logical compatibility between two or more propositions
 Compatible relation, a binary relation that commutes with each operation of an algebraic structure

Other uses
 Astrological compatibility, a branch of astrology that studies relationships by comparing natal horoscopes
 Compatibilism, a philosophical position
 Interpersonal compatibility, the long-term interaction between two or more individuals in terms of the ease and comfort of communication